Scream is a 2022 American slasher film directed by Matt Bettinelli-Olpin and Tyler Gillett, and written by James Vanderbilt and Guy Busick. It is the fifth installment in the Scream film series; though billed as a relaunch of the film series, the film is a direct sequel to Scream 4 (2011). The first film in the series to not be directed by Wes Craven, following his death in 2015, the film is dedicated to Craven at the beginning of the closing credits. The film stars Melissa Barrera, Kyle Gallner, Mason Gooding, Mikey Madison, Dylan Minnette, Jenna Ortega, Jack Quaid, Jasmin Savoy Brown, and Sonia Ammar, with Marley Shelton, Skeet Ulrich, Roger L. Jackson, Heather Matarazzo, Courteney Cox, David Arquette, and Neve Campbell reprising their roles from previous installments. The plot takes place twenty-five years after the original Woodsboro murders from Scream (1996), when yet another Ghostface appears and begins targeting a group of teenagers who are each somehow linked to the original killings. Similar to previous entries, Scream combines the violence of the slasher genre with elements of black comedy and "whodunit" mystery to satirize the trend of reboots and legacy sequels ("requels"). The film also provides commentary on the horror fandom culture, particularly the divide between "elevated horror" and classic slasher films.

Although fifth and sixth Scream installments were discussed after the release of Scream 4 in 2011, Craven, writer Kevin Williamson, and executive producer Harvey Weinstein had doubts about proceeding with more films following the less-than-expected box office performance of the fourth film. After the 2017 sexual assault allegations against Weinstein and the closure of The Weinstein Company, the rights to the Scream franchise were obtained by Spyglass Media Group in November 2019, who confirmed a new film would later be made. The following year, Williamson, who was returning as an executive producer, confirmed the film would not be a reboot and that Betinelli-Olpin and Gillett had been hired in March 2020 to direct the film. Campbell and Arquette were confirmed to be returning later that month, with Cox and the new cast members joining throughout the middle of the year. The film's production was delayed due to the COVID-19 pandemic, so filming took place between September and November 2020 in North Carolina. To avoid any plot leaks, numerous versions of the screenplay were produced and several additional scenes were filmed.

Scream was released in the United States on January 14, 2022, by Paramount Pictures. The film received generally positive reviews from critics, who praised it for honoring Craven's legacy and offering thoughtful meta-commentary on horror films, with some calling it the best of the Scream sequels. It was also a box-office success, grossing $138 million against a production budget of $24 million. A sequel, Scream VI, was released in March 2023.

Plot
Twenty-five years after Billy Loomis and Stu Macher's killing spree in Woodsboro, high school student Tara Carpenter is home alone when she is attacked by Ghostface and left hospitalized.

In Modesto, Tara's estranged older sister Sam Carpenter is informed by Wes Hicks, one of Tara's friends, about the attack. Sam returns to Woodsboro with her boyfriend Richie Kirsch to visit Tara at the hospital, where Sam is reunited with Tara's friend group: Wes, Amber Freeman, twins Chad and Mindy Meeks-Martin, and Liv McKenzie. That night, Liv's ex-boyfriend Vince Schneider, who is Stu's nephew, is killed by Ghostface. After an encounter with Ghostface at the hospital, Sam tells Tara that she has been dealing with hallucinations of Billy, who Sam learned as a teenager was her biological father. Sam's true parentage resulted in their parents' separation and this is why Sam became estranged from Tara.

Sam and Richie visit Dewey Riley, who is divorced from Gale Weathers. They ask for his help in stopping the killer, and he contacts Gale and Sidney Prescott, warning them about the return of Ghostface. Dewey joins them at Mindy and Chad's home and is reunited with the twins' mother Martha, Randy Meeks' sister. With the three attacks being on people related in some capacity to the original killers, Mindy deduces that the killer is following the rules of a "requel" – a continuation of a narrative that derives heavily from the plot of the original, while using Tara and her friends as the new generation and using Sam's connection to Billy as a way to weave the legacy characters. Ghostface then murders Wes and his mother, Sheriff Judy Hicks, at their home. Dewey reunites with Gale, who has arrived in town to cover the story. At the hospital, Tara and Richie are attacked by Ghostface, but are saved by an arriving Dewey and Sam. Sam, Tara and Richie escape, but Dewey is killed when he attempts to finish off Ghostface.  

Sidney arrives in town after learning of Dewey's death and meets both Gale and Sam at the hospital. Sidney asks Sam to help stop the killer, but Sam declines, choosing to leave town with Richie and Tara. Sidney and Gale follow the trio to Amber's, which is revealed to be Stu's former home where the original Woodsboro massacre took place. While a party is in progress to honor Wes' memory, Chad and Mindy are both attacked by Ghostface. As the friend group convenes, Amber pulls out a gun and shoots Liv in the head, revealing herself as the killer. Sidney and Gale arrive, and Richie is revealed as Amber's accomplice. He stabs Sam, and he and Amber take Sam, Sidney, and Gale into the kitchen where Sidney had first faced off against Billy and Stu.

Richie and Amber reveal they are fans of the Stab film series who met online. Disappointed in the trajectory taken with the most-recent Stab 8, they decided to embark on a new killing spree, bringing back the "original cast" to provide new-and-improved "source material" for a future "requel" Stab film and intend to frame Sam as the killer. Sam attacks Richie and Tara attacks Amber but is incapacitated; Richie goes after Sam while Sidney and Gale fight Amber together, ending with Gale breaking free and shooting Amber, who lands on a turned-on stove and is set on fire. Richie pursues Sam, who sees another hallucination of Billy, which brings her attention to Amber's abandoned knife. Embracing her paternal heritage, she uses the knife to stab Richie repeatedly before shooting and killing him. A horribly burnt Amber attempts to attack the group again but is shot to death by Tara.

Tara and the Meeks twins are loaded into ambulances to be taken to the hospital, and Sam thanks Sidney and Gale for their help. Gale promises not to write a new book about the new murders and give the killers notoriety, opting to write a tribute to Dewey instead. Sam joins Tara in the ambulance and the night's events are covered in a news report.

Cast

Previous Scream actors Matthew Lillard (Stu Macher), Drew Barrymore (Casey Becker), Jamie Kennedy (Randy Meeks), Hayden Panettiere (Kirby Reed), Henry Winkler (Arthur Himbry), and Adam Brody (Hoss) provide voice overs for partygoers who participate in a toast for Wes, which doubles as a tribute for Wes Craven. Additional voice overs in the toast are provided by directors Matt Bettinelli-Olpin and Tyler Gillett, Craven's widow Iya Labunka, previous Scream screenwriter Kevin Williamson, previous composer Marco Beltrami, previous editor Patrick Lussier, previous co-producer Julie Plec, and filmmaker Rian Johnson. Lillard also voices Ghostface in Stab 8 and Barrymore voices a school principal. An image of Panettiere as her Scream 4 (2011) character Kirby Reed is briefly shown, retroactively revealing the character to have survived the events of the film. Footage of Scream 3 (2000) star Scott Foley and Scream 2 (1997) star Joshua Jackson is briefly shown in a "Stab" film within a film, using footage of the duo taken from the Dawson's Creek episode "The Scare".

James A. Janisse and Chelsea Rebecca of the YouTube channel Dead Meat appear as the hosts of the fictional YouTube channel Film Fails. Christopher Speed portrays Randy Meeks in the film within a film Stab.

Production

Development
In 2011, Wes Craven confirmed he was contracted to work on a fifth and sixth installment of the Scream franchise, to be made if the fourth film achieved a successful release and reception. Following difficulties with script rewrites on Scream 2, Scream 3, and Scream 4, often with pages only being ready on the day of filming, and the related stress of the situation, Craven stated that he would need to see a finalized version of a script for Scream 5 before committing to the production. Kevin Williamson also confirmed he had contractual obligations for scripts for Scream 4 and Scream 5, having submitted concepts for three films leading up to Scream 6, though his contract for the sixth film had not yet been finalized. Williamson indicated that if a Scream 5 were to be made, it would be a continuation of the story of the characters who lived through Scream 4 but that Scream 4 would not include any cliffhangers that led into the potential sequel.

Before the release of Scream 4, actor David Arquette also supported a potential future of the franchise, stating "[the ending] definitely leaves it open," before adding that he would welcome the opportunity to play the character of Dewey in future installments. In May 2011, executive producer Harvey Weinstein confirmed that a sequel was possible, saying that despite Scream 4 performing below The Weinstein Company's financial expectations, he was still happy with its box office gross. In February 2012, when asked about the potential for making Scream 5, Williamson stated at the time that he did not know if it would be made, saying "I'm not doing it."

On September 30, 2013, Harvey Weinstein expressed his interest in a fifth installment, stating "I'm begging [Bob Weinstein] to do the movie and just end it. We've milked that cow." In July 2014, Williamson expressed doubt on a fifth film happening, saying "I guess Scream 4 never took off in a way they hoped". He also elaborated on his departure from the series as Craven and his team were "done with him". Williamson later detailed his plans where a proposed Scream 5 would follow Jill being stalked on a college campus, while Scream 6 would feature Gale in the lead and focus on her relationship with Dewey. On June 25, 2015, the Wall Street Journal conducted an interview with Bob Weinstein. When asked about the possibility of a film continuation after Scream 4, Weinstein firmly denied the possibility of a fifth installment or any further continuation of the film franchise, citing the MTV television series as the right place for the franchise to find new life. "It's like putting an art-house movie in an art-house theater," Weinstein said. "Where the teens reside is MTV."

Following the closure of The Weinstein Company in the wake of numerous sexual misconduct allegations against Harvey Weinstein, the fate of the Scream franchise was in limbo. In early 2019, reports began to circulate that Blumhouse Productions, which specializes in horror-themed films, was interested in reviving the series, and that studio head Jason Blum was working on making such Scream installments happen. These reports were confirmed to be false. In November 2019, Spyglass Media Group acquired the rights to make a new Scream film. It was unknown at the time if it would be a sequel, reboot, or remake. It was also unknown if Williamson would return. The next month, it was announced that the film would feature a new cast but could possibly feature appearances from previous main cast members. On November 18, 2020, Kevin Williamson revealed that the film's official title is Scream. The title Scream Forever was first considered and used on the initial draft of the script.

Bettinelli-Olpin and Gillett and casting

In March 2020, it was announced that Radio Silence's Matt Bettinelli-Olpin and Tyler Gillett would direct the fifth installment, with Kevin Williamson serving as an executive producer, and that the film had already entered official development, with filming planned to begin in May 2020. The filmmakers were in the midst of developing Cocaine Bear when the producers approached them to direct the film. In May 2020, it was announced that Neve Campbell was in talks to reprise her role as Sidney Prescott in the film. That same month, it was announced David Arquette would be reprising his role of Dewey Riley; James Vanderbilt and Guy Busick were announced as screenwriters. It was also confirmed that the film would begin production later in the year in Wilmington, North Carolina, when safety protocols to deal with the COVID-19 pandemic were in place. When writer/producer James Vanderbilt first presented the script to Williamson and asked him to be a part of the film, he turned the offer down, claiming he didn't want to be involved in a Scream project without Wes Craven. Williamson eventually contacted Vanderbilt later on, agreeing to join the film under the condition that the film be dedicated to Craven.

In June 2020, Variety reported that the film was set to be distributed by Paramount Pictures and was initially aiming for a 2021 release, which would be 25 years since the first movie was released in 1996. Variety also noted that it was still not known if Courteney Cox or Campbell, or any other legacy actors other than Arquette, would reprise their roles. On July 31, 2020, Cox posted a video to her official Instagram account, confirming her return to the franchise for the fifth installment. The news was then confirmed by various other outlets.

In August 2020, Paramount Pictures announced that the film was scheduled to be released on January 14, 2022, having been delayed from its original 2021 tentative release due to the COVID-19 pandemic. In August 2020, Melissa Barrera and Jenna Ortega were cast in undisclosed roles.  In an interview with Nightmare on Film Street on September 11, 2020, Ortega was confirmed as playing a lead role by The Babysitter: Killer Queen director McG. Also in September 2020, Jack Quaid joined the cast in an undisclosed role. In the same month, it was confirmed that Neve Campbell, Marley Shelton, and Roger L. Jackson would return to reprise their roles, with Dylan Minnette, Mason Gooding, Kyle Gallner, Jasmin Savoy Brown, Mikey Madison, and Sonia Ben Ammar joining the cast. Skeet Ulrich reprised his role as Billy Loomis for the first time since Scream (1996). Ulrich shot his scenes in one day with Barrera in front of a green screen. Rian Johnson was meant to make a cameo appearance as himself, but his commitments to Glass Onion: A Knives Out Mystery prevented him from doing so. Instead, Johnson is mentioned in passing as the director of the fictional film Stab 8.

Filming
Principal photography was originally scheduled to begin in Wilmington, North Carolina, in May 2020, but was delayed due to the COVID-19 pandemic. Filming instead began on September 23, 2020, under the working title Parkside. Filming took place across several avenues in Wilmington, including exterior shots of Williston Middle School and interior shots of Cardinal Lanes Shipyard and 10th Street (between Ann and Castle streets). The film was awarded $7million in rebates by the North Carolina Film Office. In the midst of production, the studio got cold feet on killing off the character of Dewey and requested that the directors film an alternate scene showing his survival. Bettinelli-Olpin and Gillett shot a brief scene with Campbell and Cox, with "no intention of ever fucking using it". Filming was completed on November 17, 2020. The existence of not only multiple versions of the film's screenplay but also multiple filmed scenes, to avoid details of the actual storyline being leaked before the film's release, was confirmed in April 2021. During the post-production stage, Michel Aller served as the primary editor for the film. Editor Patrick Lussier had provided feedback on an early cut of the film. Post-production on the film was completed by July 7, 2021.

Music

On May 12, 2021, it was confirmed that Brian Tyler would score the soundtrack for the film. Tyler had previously worked with Matt Bettinelli-Olpin and Tyler Gillett on Ready or Not, and would be replacing Marco Beltrami, who composed the score for the previous four films. The soundtrack album was released on January 7, 2022, by Varèse Sarabande.

Track listing:

Soundtrack

Release

Theatrical
The film was released on January 14, 2022, by Paramount Pictures. The film's red carpet premiere was scheduled for January 11, 2022, but was canceled due to the extended COVID-19 pandemic and rise of the Omicron variant.

Home media
In the United States, Scream was released digitally on March 1, 2022. It was released on Ultra HD Blu-ray, Blu-ray and DVD on April 5, 2022, by Paramount Home Entertainment.

Reception

Box office
Scream grossed $81.6million in the United States and Canada, and $57.2million in other territories, for a worldwide total of $138.9million.

In the U.S. and Canada, Scream was originally projected to gross at least $20million from 3,661 theaters over its four-day opening weekend, which included the Martin Luther King Jr. Day holiday. Some estimates were higher; Variety and Comscore both predicted a $25–30million opening. Boxoffice Pro projected a $28–39million four-day opening, factoring in positive word-of-mouth, young viewers being part of the target audience, theatrical exclusivity, ticket pre-sales and social media buzz, and the film serving as a revival to a well-known franchise. The film earned $13.3million on its first day, including $3.5million from Thursday night previews. It went on to debut to $30million (and $33.8million over the four days), becoming the first film to dethrone Spider-Man: No Way Home at the box office. Men made up 53% of the audience during its opening, with those in the age range of 18–34 comprising 67% of ticket sales and those above 25 comprising 58%. The ethnic breakdown of the audience showed that 46% were Caucasian, 33% Hispanic or Latino, 11% African American, and 5% Asian or other ethnicities. The film fell 58.7% in its sophomore weekend to $12.2million, finishing second behind No Way Home. The film earned $7.2million in its third weekend, $4.8million in its fourth, $3million in its fifth, and $2million in its sixth, $1.3million in its seventh, $575,787 in its eighth, and $469,394 in its ninth. The film dropped out of the box office top ten in its tenth weekend, finishing thirteenth with $237,315.

Outside the U.S. and Canada, the film earned $17.9million in its opening weekend from 50 markets. The film made $10.2million from 54 markets in its second weekend, $6.5million from 55 markets in its third, and $4.3 million from 59 markets in its fourth.

Critical response

On the review aggregator website Rotten Tomatoes, the film holds an approval rating of 76% based on 293 reviews, and an average rating of 6.7/10. The site's critical consensus reads, "The fifth Scream finds the franchise working harder than ever to maintain its meta edge – and succeeding surprisingly often." On Metacritic, the film has a weighted average score of 60 out of 100, based on 49 critics, indicating "mixed or average reviews". Audiences polled by CinemaScore gave the film an average grade of B+ on an A+ to F scale, while those at PostTrak gave it an overall 79% positive score, with 61% saying they would definitely recommend it.

Aedan Juvet of Screen Rant called the entry an excellent modern slasher and wrote, "Though the franchise has always been a distinguished property with pure perfection, the recent return to Scream raises the bar for aspiring slashers, once again setting a standard for modern horror – just as it did 25 years ago." Michael Phillips of the Chicago Tribune wrote: "If we were to make a franchise-reboot comparison: Scream lands about halfway between the pretty-good 2018 Halloween and the turgid follow-up Halloween Kills." Peter Bradshaw of The Guardian gave the film 3 out of 5 stars, writing "But it's still capable of delivering some piercing high-pitched decibels." Wenlei Ma of News.com.au rated the film 3 out of 5 and felt that "Scream 5 lacks the spark Bettinelli-Olpin and Gillett brought to their previous endeavour. Scream 5 is certainly funny and irreverent, but where it falls over is that it's rarely scary." Writing for The New York Times, Jeannette Catsoulis gave the film a negative review, criticizing the fan service. She stated, "Wearyingly repetitive and entirely fright-free, Scream teaches us mainly that planting Easter eggs is no substitute for seeding ideas."

The performances of the cast were particularly praised. Campbell was acclaimed for her performance, and was noted for her "fresh" take on the role of Prescott. The Hollywood Reporter wrote that "it's a pleasure to see Campbell again in fine form as Sidney, striding back into Woodsboro to take care of unfinished business". Elle magazine named Campbell the "Reigning Queen of Scream" and stated that "Sidney might not have that impact on people were it not for Campbell's portrayal, rife with vulnerability, intelligence, and a palatable dose of humor."

Accolades

Sequel

In January 2022, Neve Campbell and the film's directors expressed interest in making future films in the series. A sixth film was officially green-lit on February 3, 2022, with the same creative team returning. Courteney Cox confirmed her involvement that March.

In May 2022, it was announced that Melissa Barrera, Jasmin Savoy Brown, Mason Gooding, and Jenna Ortega would also return for the sixth film. The following day, it was also announced that Hayden Panettiere would reprise her role of Kirby Reed from the fourth film.

On June 6, Neve Campbell announced she would not be reprising her role as Sidney for the sixth film, saying "I felt the offer that was presented to me did not equate to the value I have brought to the franchise", but added, "To all my Scream fans, I love you. You've always been so incredibly supportive to me. I'm forever grateful to you and to what this franchise has given me over the past 25 years."

Scream VI was theatrically released in the United States on March 10, 2023, by Paramount Pictures.

Notes

References

External links

 
 

2022 films
2020s English-language films
2022 black comedy films
2020s American films
2020s high school films
2022 horror thriller films
2020s serial killer films
2020s slasher films
2020s teen horror films
Adaptations of works by Wes Craven
American black comedy films
American high school films
American horror thriller films
American serial killer films
American sequel films
American slasher films
American teen horror films
Home invasions in film
Lesbian-related films
LGBT-related horror films
Self-reflexive films
Film productions suspended due to the COVID-19 pandemic
Films about fandom
Films directed by Matt Bettinelli-Olpin & Tyler Gillett
Films produced by James Vanderbilt
Films scored by Brian Tyler
Films set in 2021
Films set in California
Films shot in North Carolina
Films with screenplays by Guy Busick
Films with screenplays by James Vanderbilt
Paramount Pictures films
5
Spyglass Entertainment films